Class 2600 may refer to:

Bangladesh Railway Class 2600
Queensland Railways 2600 class